Tønsberg , historically Tunsberg, is a city and municipality in Vestfold og Telemark county, eastern Norway, located around  south-southwest of Oslo on the western coast of the Oslofjord near its mouth onto the Skagerrak. The administrative centre of the municipality is the city of Tønsberg. The city is the most populous metropolis in the district of Vestfold with a population of 52,419 in 2019. Tønsberg also serves as the seat for the County Governor of Vestfold og Telemark.

Tønsberg is generally regarded as the oldest city in Norway, founded by Vikings in the 9th century. Tønsberg was established as a municipality on 1 January 1838 (see formannskapsdistrikt). The rural municipality of Sem was merged into the municipality of Tønsberg on 1 January 1988. The neighboring municipality of Re was merged into Tønsberg on 1 January 2020.

It is home to Tønsberg Fortress on Castle Mountain, which includes ruins from Castrum Tunsbergis, Norway's largest castle in the 13th century. An outdoor music festival is held at Tønsberg Fortress every July. Tønsberg is also home of Oseberg Mound, where the 9th-century Oseberg Ship was excavated.

General information

Name
The Old Norse form of the name was Túnsberg. The first element is the genitive case of tún (n), meaning fenced area or garden.  The last element is berg (n), meaning mountain. The name originally referred to the fortifications on Slottsfjellet. The old spelling has been retained in the name of the diocese, Tunsberg bispedømme.

Coat of arms
The coat of arms is an old city seal from as far back as 1349. The seal shows Tønsberg Fortress surrounded by a ring wall on a mountain with the sea in front. There is also a longship in the water in front of the fortress. Around the seal are the words (in Latin): This is the seal of Tunsberg.

History

Viking age

Tønsberg is the oldest city in Norway, founded by Harald Fairhair in the 9th century. It was also an ancient capital of Norway. The first time the town was mentioned by a contemporary writer was in 1130. According to Snorri Sturluson, Tønsberg was founded before the Battle of Hafrsfjord, which, according to Snorri, took place in 871. What year the battle took place is disputed, however, and most current historians believe the battle took place closer to 900. However, if the battle did in fact take place in 871, this would make Tønsberg one of the oldest present Scandinavian cities.  It was based upon this that the city's 1000 years jubilee was celebrated in 1871, and 1100 years jubilee in 1971. The archaeological excavations conducted in 1987–88 underneath the monastery ruins revealed several Viking graves which have served to confirm the earlier age of the original settlement.

The king or his ombudsman resided in the old Royal Court at  Sæheimr, today the Jarlsberg Manor 
(Jarlsberg Hovedgård), and on the farm Haugar, (from the Old Norse word haugr meaning hill or burial mound), which can be assumed to have been Tønsberg's birthplace. Haugar became the seat for the Haugating, the Thing for Vestfold and Norway's second most important place for the proclamation of kings. The site had probably been named after two Viking Era mounds, which tradition links to two sons of King Harald I, Olaf Haraldsson Geirstadalf, who was king in Vestfold og Telemark, and his half-brother, Sigrød Haraldsson, king of Trondheim. Both are presumed to have fallen in battle at Haugar against their half-brother Eric Bloodaxe and to have been buried on the same spot.

Slottsfjellet (Castle Mountain), north of the city centre, made for a near impregnable natural fortress. During the civil war era of the 12th century, it was fortified by the Baglers. The Birkebeiners besieged it for 20 weeks in the winter of 1201 before the Baglers surrendered. In the 13th century, King Haakon Haakonson set up a castle in Tønsberg, Tønsberg Fortress. The town was destroyed by fire in 1536, but Tønsberg remained one of the most important harbour towns in Norway. James VI of Scotland stopped in Tønsberg on his way to meet Anne of Denmark in Oslo, and David Lindsay gave a sermon on 16 November 1589. The event was recorded by a painted inscription in the church, which survives in the museum.

Whaling epoch

The center of the world's modern whaling industry was concentrated in Tønsberg and neighboring Sandefjord. Tønsberg along with neighboring Sandefjord and Larvik were dominant whaling towns in Norway. While whalers from Sandefjord established the first whaling station in the Faroe Islands, whalers from Tønsberg initiated whaling in Iceland and the Hebrides.

During the 1850s, Tønsberg turned into a base of operation and source of expertise for whalers in the Arctic- and Antarctic Oceans. Tønsberg has been called “the cradle of modern whaling. In the 1892 publication “Handbook for Travellers in Norway” by John Murray, Tønsberg is described as “the centre of the Norwegian whaling and sealing industries in the Arctic Ocean.”

The first whaling ventures to Antarctica was led by engineer Henrik Henriksen of Tønsberg. Henrik Johan Bull was another noted whaler from the district, known for his expeditions to Antarctica. Bull traveled from Australia to Tønsberg in order to learn from local whaler Svend Foyn, who is recognized as the pioneer of the modern whaling industry.

One of the city's most prominent residents, Svend Foyn, was a pioneer who embarked on an 1847 expedition to the Arctic, which led to a catch of 6,000 seals. Soon Tønsberg Harbor was home to a large fleet of sealing vessels, and the sealing industry grew further after the 1849 repeal of Britain's Navigation Acts. The hunters turned the seals to near extinction in the Arctic Ocean, and therefore turned to Bottle-nosed whales during the 1870s. Norway maintained a monopoly on European whaling until 1883, first and foremost due to Svend Foyn's patent rights to whaling techniques and inventions. Over-hunting in the Arctic eventually drove the whalers to Antarctica. By the beginning of the 20th century, Tønsberg had lost its preeminence in the whaling industry to the neighboring city of Sandefjord. Sandefjord, which lies just south of Tønsberg, later became known as the world's whaling capital.

World War II
During the German occupation of Norway in World War II, the Berg concentration camp was constructed near Tønsberg. In 1948, Tønsberg became the cathedral city of the Diocese of Tunsberg (Tunsberg bispedømme), created when the counties of Buskerud and Vestfold og Telemark were separated from the Diocese of Oslo.

Geography

Tønsberg is a city and municipality in Vestfold County, on the western shore of the Oslofjord. Tønsberg lies north of Færder, south of Horten, and north-east of Sandefjord. It is the ninth-largest city in Norway (by population). The city center lies just north from Nøtterøy Island. Besides Tønsberg proper, the municipality is also home to the villages of Barkåker and Sem. The village of Åsgårdstrand is partly in Tønsberg, although most of the village is in Horten municipality.

Tønsberg Station is 5–10 minutes walking from the main square in the city centre, known as Torvet. From the main square is a few hundred meters along Rådhusgaten to the waterfront Tønsberg Wharf ("Tønsberg Brygge"), where most cafes, bars and restaurants are located. Just south of Tønsberg are the islands of Nøtterøy and Tjøme, which are tourist destinations.

The highest point in Tønsberg is Undrumsåsen at 145 meters (476 ft.). The villages of Vear and Hognes/Bjelland were merged into Tønsberg on January 1, 2017. The neighboring municipality of Re will be merged into Tønsberg on or before January 1, 2020.

Nature preserves
Tønsberg is home to five nature preserves:

 Akersvannet (wetland), shared with Sandefjord
 Bliksekilen (wetland)
 Gullkronene (deciduous forest)
 Ilene (wetland)
 Presterødkilen (wetland)

It is also a plant preserve at Karlsvika where the goal is the preservation of the threatened species fineleaf waterdropwort (Oenanthe aquatica), a rare species in Norway.

Demographics

Tønsberg proper plus the nearby urban area makes Tønsberg the 9th most populous city in Norway, and the second-most populous city in Vestold County (after Sandefjord). City of Tønsberg is home to 51,061 residents as of 2016, whereas 17,073 residents were living on the Nøtterøy side of the border. Smaller communities in the municipality includes the villages of Barkåker (2016 pop. 1,696) and Sem (2,392). Åsgårdstrand on the Horten border lies in-between Horten- and Tønsberg municipalities. The village of Åsgårdstrand therefore has 176 residents living on the Tønsberg side of the border, despite a large majority of village residents residing in nearby Horten municipality. The city experienced a 20.8% population growth between 2000 and 2015, compared to 14.0% for Vestfold County as a whole. Furthermore, Tønsberg Municipality has the highest urbanization rate in Vestfold. While 94.6 percent of residents in Tønsberg Municipality are residing in cities, the equivalent number for Vestfold County is 84.8 percent.

As of 2018, the largest minority groups were Lithuanians (1.11%), Polish (1.68%), Iraqis (1.06%), Swedes (0.75%), and Syrians (0.64%).

Population stats

On 1 January 2009, the population of Tønsberg municipality was 38,914. The population of the urban area, Norway's tenth most populous, was 46,091. 30,061 lived in Tønsberg municipality, while 16,030 lived in Nøtterøy municipality. The urban area extends from Eik in the north, to Tolvsrød, Vallø and Ringshaug in the east and Borgheim on Nøtterøy in the south. Tønsberg municipality contains five additional urban areas: Sem, with 2,147 inhabitants of which 2,100 live in Tønsberg and 47 live in Stokke; Barkåker, with 1,292 inhabitants; Åsgårdstrand, with 2,847 inhabitants of which 2,794 in Horten and 53 in Tønsberg; Vear, with a population of 3,502 of which 2,263 live in Stokke and 1,239 live in Tønsberg, and Revetal, with 2,399 inhabitants all of which live in Tønsberg.

Sports
FK Tønsberg is the premier football team in Tønsberg, currently playing in the 2. divisjon as of 2017. Tønsberg Vikings is the local hockey team. The club played in the GET-ligaen until 2014.

Tønsberg hosted a round of the UIM F2 World Championship from 2014 - 2018.

Tourist sites

Perhaps the most important landmark in the town is Slottsfjellet, the tower standing on the hill. It was erected in 1888 as a memorial to Tønsberg Fortress (Tunsberg festning), the old fortress, of which just fragmentary ruins remain today. Below the mountain there is a museum dedicated to "Slottsfjellet" and Tønsberg. There are several exhibitions here about whaling and the fortress, Tønsberg Fortress. Several streets in the town are named after old kings of Norway.

Other notable tourist sites include:
Haugar Art Museum (Haugar Vestfold Kunstmuseum) – located in the former Seamen's School in the middle of Tønsberg, the brick building was built 1918–21.  The museum was established in 1993 as a foundation created by Vestfold county and municipality of Tønsberg.  The museum is a division of Vestfold Museum (Vestfoldmuseene). Haugar Vestfold Art Museum is located in the parkland between the site of the ancient assembly of Haugating and the two Viking era mounds.
Foynegården – the city's best-preserved merchant's yard.  Foynegården is the site of a patrician houses from the 1700s where Svend Foyn was born in 1809.
Ruins of St. Olav's Church (Olavskirken) – Former monastery founded in 1191, located near the current Tønsberg Library.
Ruins of St Michael's Church (Mikaelskirken) are still visible on top of Castle Mountain by Tønsberg Fortress. The church was mentioned among the royal chapels. It is believed to have been destroyed in 1503 when Swedish soldiers razed fortifications.
Sem Church (Sem kirke) – Vestfold's oldest stone church built before 1100 in the Romanesque style, located near the Jarlsberg Estate
Tønsberg Cathedral (Tønsberg domkirke) – Brick church from 1858 with pulpit from 1621 and an altarpiece from 1764.
Slottsfjell festival, one of the biggest happenings in Tønsberg through the year. People all over the country come to Tønsberg to participate, this festival is one of Tønsberg newly landmarks.

Oseberg Mound

Tønsberg is the site of Oseberg Mound, a Viking era burial mound. The Oseberg Ship was found in the Oseberg burial mound in 1904. This Viking era longship is now in the Viking Ship Museum in Oslo. Archaeological excavations in 1904 uncovered history's largest and richest example of craftsmanship from the Viking Age. In addition to the Oseberg Ship, Oseberghaugen contained the Oseberg carriage, five intricately carved bed-posts shaped like animal heads, four sledges, beds, chests, weaving-frames, household utensils and much more. Scientific examinations in 1992 now date the burial to 834 AD, and indicate a probability that it was Queen Alvhild, the first wife of King Gudrød, who was buried here.

When unearthed, the ship was buried in blue clay and covered with stones beneath the 6-meter high Oseberg Mound.

Economy

Tønsberg is mostly a shopping town and an administrative centre. It is also noted especially for its silverware.

Transport
The city is served by the railway line Vestfoldbanen, which runs in a loop through the city before reaching Tønsberg Station.

In popular culture
Tønsberg has been featured as a location in several films, most notably those set in the Marvel Cinematic Universe (MCU). It is first mentioned in the 2010 film Iron Man 2 as a location under surveillance by S.H.I.E.L.D. In the 2011 film Thor, it is established that centuries ago, Tønsberg was the invasion point of the Frost Giants of Jotunheim, who sought to conquer Earth before they were defeated by Odin and the forces of Asgard. It is then seen in Captain America: The First Avenger, where the Red Skull acquires the Tesseract from a church. In the 2017 film Thor: Ragnarok, Odin chooses the town as the site of his death. In Avengers: Endgame, the town is renamed "New Asgard" and serves as a refuge for the Asgardians who survived Thanos's attack during the events of Infinity War, with Valkyrie as its leader. In Thor: Love and Thunder, New Asgard has become a tourist attraction but suffers political turmoil as a result of the discrimination of Earth's governments against otherworldly beings. The Tønsberg raid by Hydra is also recreated in the first episode of What If...?, albeit it occurs much later than in Captain America: The First Avenger.

Tønsberg is also featured in the 2010 game Mount and Blade: Warbands Viking Conquest expansion as the capital of the Kingdom of Northvegr.

Notable residents

Royalty 
 Bjørn Farmann (died ca.930) King of Vestfold, founded Tønsberg
 Magnus VI of Norway (1238–1280) King of Norway (as Magnus VI) 1263 to 1280
 Margaret, Maid of Norway (1283–1290) Queen-designate of Scotland from 1286
 Else Werring (1905–1989) a Norwegian royal hostess and Chief Court Mistress from 1958

Public Service & Business 
 Cecilie Christine Schøller (1720–1786) socialite, built Stiftsgården, a royal residence
 Carl Peter Stoltenberg (1770–1830) merchant and rep. at Norwegian Constituent Assembly
 Adrian Benjamin Bentzon (1777–1827) Governor of the Danish West Indies, 1816 to 1820
 Gregers Winther Wulfsberg (1780–1846) jurist and rep. at Norwegian Constituent Assembly
 Svend Foyn (1809–1894), a  shipping and whaling magnate, introduced sealing to Vestfold
 Johan Henrik Dietrichs (1809-1886), merchant and mayor of the town
 Johan Sverdrup (1816–1892), liberal politician, prime minister of Norway from 1884 to 1889
 Wilhelm Wilhelmsen (1839–1910), a shipping magnate, founder of the Wilh. Wilhelmsen Shipping Company
 Henrik Johan Bull (1844–1930) a whaler and pioneer Antarctic explorer
 brothers Peter Christophersen (1845–1930) & Søren Andreas Christophersen (1849–1933) diplomats in Argentina
 Niels Johan Føyn (1860–1945), meteorologist
 Axel Thue (1863–1922), Norwegian American mathematician
 Ditlef Hvistendahl Christiansen (1865–1944) Norwegian Supreme Court Justice, 1911/1936
 Ole O. Lian (1868–1925), politician, leader of the Norwegian Confederation of Trade Unions
 Halfdan M. Hanson (1884–1952), Norwegian American architect
 Ole Aanderud Larsen (1884–1964) a ship designer, designed the Endurance
 Eugène Olaussen (1887–1962) a newspaper editor and politician; from communist to Nazi 
 Arnold Rørholt (1909–1986) a Norwegian jurist and refugee worker
 Ebba Lodden (1913–1997) civil servant and politician, first female County Governor
 Jan Mehlum (born 1945), author and academic, comes from Tønsberg
 Laila Riksaasen Dahl (born 1947) theologian, bishop of the Diocese of Tunsberg 2002/2014
 Jan Otto Myrseth (born 1957) a prelate, the current Bishop of Tunsberg
 Per Arne Olsen (born 1961) a politician, Mayor of Tønsberg 2003 to 2009
 Reidar Hjermann (born 1969) psychologist and former Children's Ombudsman of Norway
 Joshua French (born 1982) a Norwegian-British murderer convicted in the Congo, grew up in Re

The Arts 

 Mathias Stoltenberg (1799–1871) a portrait painter and furniture restorer
 Clara Tschudi (1856–1945) a writer of biographies of contemporary and historical women
 Elisabeth Meyer (1899–1968) a Norwegian photographer and journalist
 Thomas Thomassen (1878–1962) a Norwegian actor, director and theater manager 
 Per Gjersøe (1908–1980) a Norwegian actor and film director 
 Kåre Holt (1916–1997) a Norwegian author from Våle
 Per Asplin (1928–1996) a Norwegian pianist, singer, composer and actor 
 Kjell Heggelund (1932–2017) a literary researcher, lecturer, editor, poet and literary critic
 Wenche Blomberg (born 1943) an author, journalist, librarian and criminologist
 Bjørn Floberg (born 1947) a Norwegian actor of film, TV and theatre 
 Jahn Teigen (1949-2020) singer and comedian, 3 times in the Eurovision Song Contest 
 Gro Dahle (born 1962), author and poet, grew up in Tønsberg
 twins Egil Nyhus & Svein Nyhus (born 1962) Norwegian illustrators
 Sturla Berg-Johansen (born 1967), stand-up comedian, comes from Tønsberg
 Ilze Burkovska Jacobsen, (Norwegian Wiki) (born 1971) Latvian filmmaker, lives in Tønsberg
 Lene Nystrøm (born 1973), lead vocalist of the Danish-Norwegian dance group Aqua
 siblings Line Horntveth (born 1974) & Martin Horntveth (born 1977) & Lars Horntveth (born 1980)  Norwegian jazz musicians
 Frøy Aagre (born 1977) a Norwegian jazz tenor and soprano saxophone player
 Seigmen (formed 1989) an alternative rock band, comes from Tønsberg
 Kyrre Gørvell-Dahll (born 1991) known as Kygo, a DJ, songwriter and record producer 
 Adelén (born 1996), singer
 Emma Ellingsen (born 2001) a Norwegian transgender model and YouTuber

Sport 
 Hjalmar Andersen (1923–2013) speed skater, three gold medals at the 1952 Winter Olympics
 Ronny Johnsen (born 1969) former footballer with Manchester United F.C. has 384 club caps and 62 with  Norway, lives in Tønsberg
 Linda Cerup-Simonsen (born 1969) a sailor, team gold medallist at the 1992 Summer Olympics
 Anders Aukland (born 1972) cross-country skier, team gold medallist, 2002 Winter Olympics
 Rune Monstad (born 1973) known as The Viking Biker, a Norwegian cyclist who cycled around the world on a 27-speed Gekko mountain bike from 2005 to 2010
 Morten Hagen (born 1974) a Norwegian professional golfer
 Kristine Duvholt Havnås (born 1974) a former Norwegian team handballer, team silver medallist at the 1992 Summer Olympics and team bronze medallist at the 2000 Summer Olympics
 Tonje Larsen (born 1975) a retired Norwegian Olympic team champion handballer 
 Olaf Tufte (born 1976) a rower, firefighter and farmer; has four Olympic medals
 John Arne Riise (born 1980) former footballer with Liverpool F.C. has 546 club caps and 110 with  Norway, lives in Tønsberg
 Espen Bugge Pettersen (born 1980) a former football goalkeeper with 440 club caps
 Lisa-Marie Woods (born 1984) a Norwegian professional football midfielder
 Kjetil Borch (born 1990) world rowing champion, team bronze medallist, 2016 Summer Olympics
 Magnus Carlsen (born 1990), chess grandmaster, & World Chess Champion
 Anine Rabe (born 1992) a Norwegian former figure skater
 Ali Srour (born 1994) known as "Prince" Ali, a Lebanese professional boxer from Tønsberg

Gallery

Twin towns – sister cities

The following cities are twinned with Tønsberg:

 Covarrubias, Spain
 Évora, Portugal
 Ísafjörður, Iceland
 Joensuu, Finland
 Lamia, Greece
 Linköping, Sweden
 Ravenna, Italy
 Waterford, Ireland

References

External links

Municipal fact sheet from Statistics Norway

Municipality website 
Tønsberg Navigasjonsskole
Haugar Art Museum

 
Municipalities of Vestfold og Telemark
Populated places in Vestfold og Telemark
Cities and towns in Norway
Port cities and towns in Norway
Port cities and towns of the North Sea
Populated places established in the 9th century